The Kagzi also pronounced kagdi are a Muslim community found in the states of Gujarat and Maharashtra in India.

History and origin 

The term Kagzi in Urdu means a manufacturer of paper, from the word kagaz or paper. There are, in fact, two distinct Kagzi communities, with their own customs, traditions and origin myths, one found in Gujarat and the other in Maharashtra

The Gujarat Kagzi claim  to the invitation of Sultan Ahmad Shah. The community have always been associated with the manufacture of paper, and many still reside in the Shahpur area of Ahmedabad their original settlement in Gujarat. Numerous Kagzi families also live in Kagziwaad, Rajaji's Pole and Munshi ka dehla localities in Shahpur, part of the old city. They are typically fair skinned and light eyed. In Maharashtra, the Kagzi claim to be descended from soldiers of the Tughlaq armies that invaded the Deccan. They are now found mainly in the districts of Aurangabad, Jalgaon, Pune, Akola and Nasik. The Maharashtra Kagzi speak the Dakhani dialect of Urdu, although most can understand Marathi.

Present circumstances 

The Gujarat Kagzi are divided into a number of clans, the main ones being the Turkish Sheikh, Raddiwala, Khanzada, Munshi and Mirza. Their traditional occupation has been greatly affected by the growth of paper mills, and many Kagzis have abandoned their paper manufacturing. Many are now involved in petty trade, or have taken to farming. The Ahmadabad Kagzi Jamaat is their caste association, and deals with the various problems of the community.

The Maharashtra Kagzi are divided into a number of territorial groupings, such as the Yawalwale, Badwale and Kalekhwale. Each of these territorial groupings has a caste association, known as a jamaat. Although marriages are permitted within these groupings, they are rare. The Kaghzi have seen a complete decline in their traditional occupation, and most are now either businessmen or involved in other occupations. They are one of the most successful Muslim community in Maharashtra, and have a fairly active caste association, the Kagzi Jamaat, which deals with issues of community welfare. They belong to the Sunni sect, and have been affected by the Barelvi Deobandi split among the Sunnis. .

See also
Muslim Kadia

References 

Social groups of Gujarat
Muslim communities of India
Muslim communities of Gujarat